Harold Watson (24 December 1879 – 2 July 1958) was a New Zealand cricketer. He played first-class cricket for Canterbury, Otago and Wellington between 1913 and 1924. His brother, Leo, also played cricket for Otago.

See also
 List of Otago representative cricketers

References

External links
 

1879 births
1958 deaths
Canterbury cricketers
Cricketers from Nottinghamshire
New Zealand cricketers
Otago cricketers
People from Calverton, Nottinghamshire
Wellington cricketers
British emigrants to New Zealand